Glass Jaw (Original title: Lasileuka) is a 2004 Finnish short drama film directed by Zaida Bergroth and starring Emilia Sinisalo.

Plot summary 
Teenage Marianne and her little sister live with their alcoholic mother. The social service wants to get hold of them.

Cast 
 Emilia Sinisalo as Marianne
 Leea Klemola as Gunni
 Tiina Puntala as Emilia
 Jarkko Niemi as Remu
 Tommy Sklavos as Peter

Production 
This film was director Zaida Bergroth's diploma work for University of Art and Design Helsinki, School of Motion picture, Television and Production design (UIAH).

Awards 
The film won a Special Prize for "Finnish Short Film Over 30 Minutes" at the 2004 Tampere International Short Film Festival.

References

External links 
 

2004 short films
2004 films
2004 drama films
2000s Finnish-language films
Finnish short films
Finnish drama films